, also known as My Guardian Characters, is a Japanese shōjo manga series created by the manga author duo, Peach-Pit. The story centers on elementary school girl Amu Hinamori, whose popular exterior, referred to as "cool and spicy" by her classmates, contrasts with her introverted personality. When Amu wishes for the courage to be reborn as her would-be self, she is surprised to find three colorful eggs the next morning, which hatch into three Guardian Characters: Ran, Miki, and Su.

The manga has been adapted to three animated seasons. The anime adaptation consists of twelve opening and ending singles (six for endings, four for openings and two containing both), two insert song singles, two character albums, four original soundtracks, one game single, and four drama CDs.

This article also includes a description of some of the groups formed to deliver these songs.

Shugo Chara Egg!

 was a Japanese idol project group formed by Up-Front Promotion in 2008 and associated with Hello! Project. The group was created to perform music for the Shugo Chara! anime series. The members' original line-up consisted of trainees from Hello! Project's pre-debut team, Hello! Pro Egg: Yuuka Maeda, Akari Saho, Kanon Fukuda and Ayaka Wada.

Aside from performing music for Shugo Chara!, Shugo Chara Egg! also starred in its musical theatre adaptation, Shugo Chara! the Musical. After Maeda, Fukuda, and Wada departed to debut in Smileage, they were replaced by Mizuki Fukumura, Irori Maeda, and Nanami Tanabe, who hosted the live-action segments in Shugo Chara! Party!

2008–2009: Debut, Shugo Chara! the Musical
On September 3, 2008, Hello! Project announced that they would be forming a collaboration subgroup set to debut in October to perform theme songs for the Shugo Chara! anime series, with members from Hello! Project's pre-debut trainee team, Hello Pro Egg. The members were revealed during a Shugo Chara! event on September 20, 2008 attended by 1,000 people, featuring Yuuka Maeda as Amulet Heart, Akari Saho as Amulet Spade, Kanon Fukuda as Amulet Clover, and Ayaka Wada as Amulet Diamond. Shugo Chara Egg!'s debut single, "Minna no Tamago", was featured as the opening theme song for Shugo Chara! beginning October 4, 2008, with the single released on December 10, 2008. The single also included a B-side titled "Hajimari no Uta." The video single was released on January 21, 2009.

On December 26, 2008, their second single, "Shugo Shugo!", was announced as the new opening theme song for the newest season of the show, Shugo Chara! Doki, set to broadcast in January 2009 with a physical release on February 25, 2009. In April 2009, Shugo Chara Egg! performed a cover version of Guardians 4's debut song "Omakase Guardian", which was released as a B-side on the single.

A musical theatre adaptation of Shugo Chara! set to run from August 13 to August 23 was announced in January 2009, with all members of Shugo Chara Egg! appearing in the play. On May 1, 2009, news reports revealed Maeda in the lead role as Amu,  Fukuda as Nadeshiko, and Saho and Wada as part of the ensemble cast. Shortly after the announcement, Hello! Project stated that Maeda, Fukuda, and Wada were withdrawing from the group after the musical to debut in Smileage. Their final song with the group was a cover version of Guardian 4's song "School Days", which appeared as a B-side on the single and released on September 2, 2009.

2009–2010: Line-up changes and disbandment
The October 2009 issue of Nakayoshi revealed Mizuki Fukumura and Irori Maeda as the new Amulet Heart and Amulet Clover, and they would be hosting the live-action segments of Shugo Chara!s newest season, Shugo Chara! Party!, with Saho. The group released the song "Watashi no Tamago" as a double A-side to Guardian 4's third single, "Party Time", on November 18, 2009.

Nanami Tanabe was chosen to replace Wada's role as Amulet Diamond in January 2010. On January 20, 2010, Shugo Chara Egg! released the song  as a B-side to Guardian 4's final single. On March 10, 2010, a compilation album was released featuring songs by Shugo Chara Egg!, Guardians 4, and Buono!, titled Shugo Chara! Song Best. The DVD compilation featuring their music videos, titled Shugo Chara! Clip Best, was released on March 17, 2010. After the final episode of Shugo Chara! Party aired March 27, 2010, activities for the group ended.

Members

  as Amulet Spade (2008-2010)
  as Amulet Heart (2009-2010)
  as Amulet Clover (2009-2010)
  as Amulet Diamond (2009-2010)

Former members
  as Amulet Heart (2008)
  as Amulet Clover (2008)
  as Amulet Dia (2008)

Television

Theater

Guardians 4

 was a Japanese idol project group formed by Up-Front Promotion in 2009 and associated with Hello! Project. The group was created to perform music for the Shugo Chara! anime series. The members consist of Aika Mitsui from Morning Musume, Yurina Kumai and Risako Sugaya from Berryz Kobo, and Saki Nakajima from Cute.

History
In April 2009, Hello! Project announced a new subgroup to perform music for the second season of the Shugo Chara! anime series, titled Shugo Chara!! Doki. The group features Aika Mitsui from Morning Musume, Yurina Kumai and Risako Sugaya from Berryz Kobo, and Saki Nakajima from Cute. Their debut single, "Omakase Guardian", was first broadcast as Shugo Chara!! Doki'''s opening theme song on April 4, 2009, beginning with episode 77. The song was released as a single on May 27, 2009, along with a cover version by Shugo Chara Egg! and "Summer Has Come!" as B-side songs. The video single was released on June 10, 2009.

Guardians 4 released their second single, "School Days", as the second opening theme song of Shugo Chara!! Doki on September 2, 2009. The single contained a cover version of the song by Shugo Chara Egg! and "Itsuka Koko de" as B-side songs. The video single was released on September 16, 2009. After the song was featured for two months, Guardians 4 released the song "Party Time" as the first opening song to Shugo Chara!s third season, Shugo Chara! Party!, which began broadcast in October 2009. "Party Time" was released on November 18, 2009, as a double A-side single with "Watashi no Tamago", the series' ending theme song, by Shugo Chara Egg! The video single was released on December 2, 2009.

Guardians 4 released their final single as a group, "Going On!", as the final opening theme song for Shugo Chara! Party! on January 20, 2010, which contained the B-side  by Shugo Chara Egg! The video single was released on February 3, 2010. On March 10, 2010, a compilation album was released featuring songs by Guardians 4, Buono!, and Shugo Chara Egg!, titled Shugo Chara! Song Best. The DVD compilation featuring their music videos, titled Shugo Chara! Clip Best, was released on March 17, 2010. After the final episode of Shugo Chara! Party aired March 27, 2010, activities for the group ended.

Members
  from Morning Musume
  from Berryz Kobo
  from Cute
  from Berryz Kobo

Endings

Honto no Jibun

 is the first single by the Hello! Project unit Buono!, featuring Airi Suzuki, Miyabi Natsuyaki, Momoko Tsugunaga as the main performers and Maimi Yajima and Chisato Okai as background characters in the song's Promotional Video. Honto no Jibun is the first song used for the ending theme of the anime Shugo Chara!, and Kokoro no Tamago, the B-side of the CD, is the first song used for the opening theme.

Renai Rider

 is the second single by the Hello! Project unit Buono!. The title song is used for the second ending theme of Shugo Chara!.

Kiss! Kiss! Kiss!

Kiss! Kiss! Kiss! is the third single by the Hello! Project unit Buono!. Kiss! Kiss! Kiss! is the third song used for the ending theme of the anime Shugo Chara!, and Minna Daisuki, the B-side of the CD, is the second song used for the opening theme.

Gachinko de Ikou!

 is the fourth single by the Hello! Project unit Buono!. The title song is used for the fourth ending theme of Shugo Chara!.

Rottara Rottara

 is the fifth single by the Hello! Project unit Buono!. The title song is used for the first ending theme of Shugo Chara!! Doki—.

Minna no Tamago

 is the first single by the Hello! Project unit Shugo Chara Egg!. The title song is the first song used for the opening theme of Shugo Chara!! Doki—.

Co-no-Mi-chi

 is the sixth single by the Hello! Project unit Buono!. The title song is the second song used for the ending theme of Shugo Chara!! Doki—.

Shugo Shugo!

 is the second single by the Hello! Project unit Shugo Chara Egg!. The title song is the second song used for the opening theme of Shugo Chara!! Doki—.

MY BOY

MY BOY is the seventh single by the Hello! Project unit Buono!. The title song is the third song used for the ending theme of Shugo Chara!! Doki—.

Omakase♪Guardian

 is the first single by the Hello! Project unit Guardians 4 featuring Aika Mitsui, Yurina Kumai, Saki Nakajima and Risako Sugaya. The title song is the third song used for the opening theme of Shugo Chara!! Doki—.

Take It Easy!

Take it Easy! is the eighth single by the Hello! Project unit Buono!. The title song is the fourth song used for the ending theme of Shugo Chara!! Doki—.

School Days

School Days is the second single by the Hello! Project unit Guardians 4. The title song is the fourth song used for the opening theme of Shugo Chara!! Doki—.

PARTY TIME

PARTY TIME is the third single by the Hello! Project unit Guardians 4. The title song is the first song used for the opening theme of Shugo Chara Party. The B-side is Watashi no Tamago, which is performed by the Hello! Project unit Shugo Chara Egg! and is used as the 1st opening theme of Shugo Chara!!! Dokki Doki and Shugo Chara Party.

Bravo☆Bravo

Bravo☆Bravo is the ninth single by the Hello! Project unit Buono!. The title song is the first song used for the ending theme of Shugo Chara Party.

Going On!

Going On! is the fourth single by the Hello! Project unit Guardians 4. The title song is the second song used for the opening theme of Shugo Chara!!! Dokki Doki and Shugo Chara Party.

Our Songs

Insert Songs

Meikyū Butterfly

BLACK DIAMOND

Character Song Albums

Shugo Chara! Character Song Album Best!

Shugo Chara! Character Song Album Best! 2

Shugo Chara! Character Song Album Best! 3

Soundtracks

Shugo Chara! Original Soundtrack Vol.1

Shugo Chara! Original Soundtrack Vol.2

Shugo Chara! Original Soundtrack Vol.3

Shugo Chara! Original Soundtrack Vol.4

Shugo Chara!! Doki Original Soundtrack Vol.1

Shugo Chara!! Doki Original Soundtrack Vol.2

Others

Niji-iro Chara Change!

Chart performance

 Singles 
For Shugo Chara Egg!:

For Guardians 4:

Video singles
For Shugo Chara Egg!:

For Guardians 4'':

Notes

References

External links
Anime official website 
Official Buono site 
Official Shugo Chara Egg! site 
Official Guardians4 site 
Hello Project Buono's Discography 
Hello Project Shugo Chara Egg!'s Discography 
Hello Project Guardians 4's Discography 
 Guardians 4 

Anime soundtracks
Soundtracks
Film and television discographies
Discographies of Japanese artists
Lists of soundtracks